Adobe Connect (formerly Presedia Publishing System, Macromedia Breeze, and Adobe Acrobat Connect Pro) is a suite of software for remote training, web conferencing, presentation, and desktop sharing. All meeting rooms are organized into 'pods'; with each pod performing a specific role (e.g. chat, whiteboard, note etc.) Adobe Connect was formerly part of the Adobe Acrobat family and has changed names several times.

History 
The product was first developed by a startup called Presedia and included a first generation PowerPoint-to-Flash Plugin (which then became Adobe Presenter) and a training module. Macromedia acquired Presedia and added on a real-time web conferencing component, called Breeze Live (later renamed Breeze Meeting).

In version 5, Macromedia Breeze included four applications: Breeze Presenter test, Breeze Training, Breeze Meeting, and Breeze Events (new in version 5). Following the acquisition by Adobe, Macromedia Breeze Meeting was initially rebranded to Adobe Connect, then Adobe Acrobat Connect Professional and later as Adobe Connect. The full product line includes rebranded versions of Breeze Training, Breeze Meeting, Breeze Presenter, and Breeze Events.

Features

Contents of the suite
Adobe Connect includes the following applications:
 Adobe Connect Webinars (formerly Breeze Events)
 Adobe Connect Learning (formerly Breeze Training)
 Adobe Connect Meetings (formerly Breeze Presenter)

It can interoperate with Adobe Captivate, a rapid eLearning authoring tool with capability to publish directly the Connect server.

Capabilities
 Unlimited and customizable meeting rooms
 Multiple meeting rooms per user
 Breakout sessions within a meeting
 VoIP
 Audio and video conferencing
 Meeting recording
 Screen sharing
 Notes, chat, and whiteboards
 User management, administration, and reporting
 Polling
 Central content library
 Collaboration Builder SDK
 Mobile app (Android & iOS)
 HTML5 clients

Change log

See also
 Collaborative software
 Comparison of web conferencing software
Videotelephony
 Microsoft Teams

References

External links
 
Adobe Connect User Guide, at Adobe  
 Video tutorials for Adobe Connect, at Carahsoft

Connect
Connect
Remote desktop
Web conferencing
Teleconferencing
Videotelephony